Mark Sadan is an American photographer, film maker and visual artist.

Career 
Mark Sadan began his work in art as an actor in his early twenties graduating from the American Academy of Dramatic Arts in New York City.

As an experimental filmmaker he received two special screenings of his films in cine-probes at the Museum of Modern Art in New York City. Later, he was awarded a full scholarship to study at the Graduate Film and Television Institute of New York University. He produced short films for Sesame Street, and NBC television. After directing a documentary in Norway, Sadan was invited to exhibit at the Preus Foto Museum and later decided to pursuit a career as photographer. This led to an exhibit on Norway at the World Trade Center.

Sadan has given workshops in the US and abroad. He has exhibited in Eastern Europe, Scandinavia, North America and the UK. His work has been featured in photo magazines such as La Photographica from Spain, Zoom from Italy, Iris from Brazil, Nippon and Asahi in Japan, SchwarzWeiss (Black & White) Germany, and Foto-Forum Norway. In the USA American Photo, Popular Photography, Dance Magazine and The New York Times published Sadan's photos. His work is also found in private and museum collections.

Recently, he has had solo exhibitions at the Julia Margaret Cameron Museum on the Isle of Wight, the National Museum of Dance in the USA, the Museum of New Art in Estonia and the Preus National Photo Art Museum in Norway.

Personal life
Sadan was charged with two counts of aggravated sexual assault of a minor in 2015, by Vermont Police. A warrant had been issued for Sadan's arrest in Vermont on Dec. 8 after being accused by Montpelier Police of sexually assaulting two minors over several years. U.S. Marshals believe Sadan fled to Florida as a result of the arrest warrant. The Montpelier Police Department contacted U.S. Marshals seeking their assistance in locating Sadan and authorities were able to locate him according to the marshals.

Sex Offender Registry
April. 19th, 2016 Sadan was convicted of LEWD-LASCIVIOUS CONDUCT WITH CHILD.

References

External links
 Dancerzine.com

American Academy of Dramatic Arts alumni
American photographers
American filmmakers
Living people
Year of birth missing (living people)